Grégoire de Galzain (born 23 December 1971 in Versailles) is a retired French racing driver.

Racing record

Complete International Formula 3000 results
(key) (Races in bold indicate pole position; races in italics indicate fastest lap.)

References

1971 births
Living people
French racing drivers
International Formula 3000 drivers
Sportspeople from Versailles, Yvelines

Oreca drivers
DAMS drivers
Graff Racing drivers